The Lewis Ainsworth House is a restored American Craftsman style home in the city of Orange, in Orange County, California. The house is one of many preserved historic homes in and around Old Towne Orange. The home currently stands next to St. John's Lutheran Church, across the street from the city's public library, and nearby the Orange City Hall. It is currently owned by the City of Orange.

History
Lewis Ainsworth originally came to California in search of gold during the California Gold Rush in 1849. He moved around the country for most of his life, but settled in Orange in 1900. Ainsworth was the owner of Ainsworth Lumber & Milling Company. Ainsworth had the home built in 1910 as a retirement home, and he lived there with his wife Persis and several children. It was designed by Ina Ainsworth Butler, daughter of Lewis and Persis. Lewis Ainsworth lived at the home for only four years until his death in 1914, and was sick for most of the time. The house remained in the family until 1975.  It was purchased by the city in 1976 and later restored.

The home was added to the National Register of Historic Places on March 13, 1981. In 1997, Old Town Orange, the district in which the house lies, was also added to the database.

References

External links

Orange's Architectural Legacy: A Place Called Home—Ainsworth House
 Google Maps: Street-level view and map of the Ainsworth House

Houses in Orange County, California
Buildings and structures in Orange, California
Houses completed in 1910
Houses on the National Register of Historic Places in California
National Register of Historic Places in Orange County, California
American Craftsman architecture in California